Astaf is a village and municipality in the Dashkasan Rayon of Azerbaijan.  It has a population of 361.

References 

Populated places in Dashkasan District